Ethmia namangana is a moth in the family Depressariidae. It was described by Rebel in 1901. It is found in Uzbekistan.

The forewings are dark grey with three deep black spots. The hindwings are somewhat lighter.

References

Moths described in 1901
namangana